The 2021–22 Boston University Terriers Men's ice hockey season was the 94th season of play for the program. They represented Boston University in the 2021–22 NCAA Division I men's ice hockey season and for the 38th season in the Hockey East conference. The Terriers were coached by Albie O'Connell, in his fourth season, and played their home games at Agganis Arena.

Season
BU entered the season with a great deal of hope after making the NCAA tournament despite having to cancel several games as a result of COVID-19. The Terriers received a top 10 ranking in the preseason polls and were expected to compete for the Hockey East championship. When they hit the ice, however, Boston University got off to a terrible start. BU got off to a 3–7 record with their offense struggling mightily in the first month. Despite Drew Commesso playing well in goal, the Terriers scored more than two goals in just three of those contests. By mid-November the team appeared to be rounding into form but were still a middling team in their conference. Ordinarily that might not have been a terrible position to be in, however, Hockey East was having a bad season with a poor non-conference record.

While the first half of their season was disastrous to the Terrier's postseason hopes, their situation went from bad to worse in late December. During the winter break, Tyler Boucher left the team and signed a professional contract with the Ottawa Senators. In spite of losing their top prospect, however, BU came out guns blazing in the second half and won seven of their next eight games.

The winning streak was put in jeopardy when Commesso was selected to be a member of the United States national team at the 2022 Winter Olympics. The team rallied around backup Vinny Duplessis, however, and continued to pile up wins. Boston University went so far as to knock off Northeastern in the Beanpot championship, capturing their first title in seven years.

Commesso returned to campus at the end of February found his team with a top-15 ranking and a near-lock for the NCAA tournament. Unfortunately, the team faltered at the very end of the season and lost two of their last three regular season games. The defeats pushed BU down to 5th-place in the standings and below the cutoff line for at-large bids. The Terriers still had a chance to win their way into the tournament but they would need a good showing in the Hockey East playoffs. In their quarterfinal match, BU took on Connecticut and were stymied by a stellar performance from Darion Hanson. The 1–3 loss ended the Terriers' once promising season.

After the year, head coach Albie O'Connell was fired after having made the NCAA tournament just once in his four years behind the bench.

Departures

Recruiting

Roster
As of August 12, 2021.

|}

Standings

Schedule and results

|-
!colspan=12 style=";" | Exhibition

|-
!colspan=12 ! style=""; | Regular Season

|-
!colspan=12 ! style=""; | 

|-
!colspan=12 style=";" |

Scoring statistics

Goaltending statistics

Rankings

Note: USCHO did not release a poll in week 24.

Awards and honors

Players drafted into the NHL

2022 NHL Entry Draft

† incoming freshman

References

2021–22
2021–22 Hockey East men's ice hockey season
2021–22 NCAA Division I men's ice hockey by team
Boston University Terriers men's ice hockey
Boston University Terriers men's ice hockey
Boston University Terriers men's ice hockey
Boston University Terriers men's ice hockey